The Hon. Henry Thomas Smith-Stanley (9 March 1803 – 2 April 1875) was a British politician. He was MP for Preston 1832–1837.

Smith-Stanley was the son of Edward Smith-Stanley, 13th Earl of Derby, and his wife Charlotte Hornby. Edward Smith-Stanley, 14th Earl of Derby, three times Prime Minister, was Smith-Stanley's older brother.

He was educated at Eton College, and matriculated at Trinity College, Cambridge, in 1821. He transferred to St Mary Hall, Oxford, matriculating in 1826, aged 22.

He served as a JP and DL, and as MP for Preston 1832–1837.

He died on 2 April 1875.

Family
Smith-Stanley married Anne Woolhouse, daughter of Richard Woolhouse, on 1 September 1835. They had four children:
 Charlotte Margaret Sidney Anne Stanley (1842–1872)
 Edward Henry Stanley (1838–1877)
 Charles Geoffrey Stanley (1839–1877)
 Henry Edmund Stanley (1840–1867)

References

1803 births
1875 deaths
Younger sons of earls
People educated at Eton College
Alumni of Trinity College, Cambridge
Alumni of St Mary Hall, Oxford
Whig (British political party) MPs for English constituencies
UK MPs 1832–1835
UK MPs 1835–1837